The Challenger de Villa María is a professional tennis tournament played on clay courts. It is currently part of the Association of Tennis Professionals (ATP) Challenger Tour. It has been held in Villa María, Argentina since 2022.

Past finals

Singles

Doubles

References

ATP Challenger Tour
Clay court tennis tournaments
Tennis tournaments in Argentina